Gaynor Park is an urban park located in and administered by the city of Wisconsin Rapids, Wisconsin.

Gaynor Park was named after John A. Gaynor, a local judge.

References

Wisconsin Rapids, Wisconsin
Geography of Wood County, Wisconsin
Parks in Wisconsin